Maebyeong refers to Korean vessels with a small slightly curled mouth rim, short neck, round shoulder, and constricted waist. The maebyong is derived from the Chinese meiping (literally "plum vase"). They were first used to hold wine and later branches of plum blossoms.

Some of these vessels have a cup-shaped cover over the mouth, so that they seemed to be used to store high quality wine such as insamju (인삼주, ginseng wine) or maehwaju (매화주; rice wine made with plum) It would have originally had a lid and there are many maebyong with ginseng leaves on the surfaces.

Gallery

See also
Korean pottery and porcelain
Buncheong
Joseon white porcelain

References

Sources

External links 

Korean pottery